The black-and-rufous warbling finch (Poospiza nigrorufa) is a species of bird in the tanager family Thraupidae.

It is found in Argentina, Bolivia, Brazil, Paraguay, and Uruguay. Its natural habitats are subtropical or tropical dry shrubland, subtropical or tropical moist shrubland, swamps, and heavily degraded former forest.

This species was formerly considered conspecific with the black-and-chestnut warbling finch (Poospiza whitii). The taxa were split based on molecular genetic and phenotypic data.

References

Further reading

black-and-rufous warbling finch
Birds of the Selva Misionera
Birds of the South Region
Birds of Argentina
Birds of Uruguay
black-and-rufous warbling finch
Taxonomy articles created by Polbot